Choi Byung-chan (born November 12, 1997), also known as Byungchan, is a South Korean singer and actor. He debuted as a member of South Korean group Victon in 2016. In 2020, he made his acting debut in the drama Live On.

Career

2016–2018: Debut with Victon 
Choi joined A Cube Entertainment (which became Plan A in 2015 and then IST Entertainment in 2022) as a trainee in 2014 and was among the company's earliest batch of male trainees alongside Victon members Heo Chan, Han Seung-woo and Kang Seung-sik. In 2016 he was announced as a member of their new boy group, then referred to as "Plan A Boys", participating in their pre-debut reality show Me and 7 Men. In November 2016, Choi debuted in Plan A's new group, officially named Victon.

2019–present: Produce X 101 and acting debut 
In 2019, Choi competed in Produce X 101 alongside groupmate Han Seung-woo. Choi withdrew from the show permanently on July 11 to recover from the increasing pain brought by his chronic Achilles tendinitis. After recovering, he became an MC for the SBS MTV program Banban Show along with host Jang Sung-kyu and fellow Produce X 101 participant Song Yuvin. After withdrawing from the show, he returned to Victon for their Nostalgia promotions.

During promotions for Victon's sixth EP Continuous Choi limited his participation due to a herniated disk in his neck.

In November 2020, Choi made his acting debut in the show Live On. He played the role of Kim Yoo-shin and he gained praise for his three-dimensional acting for the character. In promotion of his acting debut, he appeared in the magazine 1st Look.

In October 2021, Choi appeared in his first historical drama The King's Affection.

In February 2022, Choi played Shin Ha-min in the series Business Proposal.

Discography

Filmography

Television series

Television shows

References

External links

 
 
 

Living people
1997 births
21st-century South Korean male  singers
K-pop singers
IST Entertainment artists
South Korean male idols
Victon members
South Korean pop singers
South Korean male television actors
People from Jeonju